Vera Miletić (Serbian Cyrillic: Вера Милетић; 8 March 1920 – 7 September 1944) was a Serbian student and soldier. She was notable for being the mother of Mira Marković, posthumously making her the mother-in-law of Serbian president Slobodan Milošević.

Personal life
Her cousin was  who was the personal secretary of Communist Party of Yugoslavia leader Josip Broz Tito.

References

1920 births
1944 deaths
People from Petrovac, Serbia
Serbian communists
Yugoslav communists
Yugoslav Partisans members
Women in the Yugoslav Partisans
Slobodan Milošević
Banjica concentration camp inmates
Resistance members killed by Nazi Germany
Serbian people executed in Nazi concentration camps
Yugoslav people executed in Nazi concentration camps
People executed by Nazi Germany by firing squad